Divine Child High School, commonly known as Divine Child (DC), is a private, Roman Catholic, college-preparatory, parish high school  in Dearborn, Michigan, United States. Divine Child is a highly ranked private high school in Michigan, scoring in the top 15 percent of private schools in the State. Notably, it is the seventh-largest private high school in Michigan and the largest co-educational Catholic high school in the State.

Divine Child Catholic Schools together have nearly 1,400 students enrolled K-12, making it the fourth largest private school community in the State. Over 11,000 students have graduated from Divine Child High School.

The school is located on a 20-acre campus that includes a new athletic complex and fitness center, which was financed through an ongoing capital campaign that has raised five million in capital to date.

Overview

Divine Child High School is a highly rated, Catholic, college-preparatory high school located in Dearborn, Michigan. Divine Child is ranked among the top 15% of private high schools in the State of Michigan as of the 2021–2022 school year. It is the State's largest Catholic co-ed high school, enrolling over 870 students from 55 different zip codes; minority enrollment at the school is 18.6 percent, and the student-teacher ratio is 12:1.

The school follows an all school uniform policy, with boys wearing khaki slacks  and an Oxford shirt and tie, and girls may either wear a kilt or slacks, along with a button-up shirt, with both wearing blazers.  As of 2022, Divine Child Catholic Schools had an estimated financial endowment of twelve million dollars.

History
Divine Child High School was founded in September 1958 by Monsignor Herbert Weier. Initially, it consisted of 84 freshmen, two Bernardine Sisters of St. Francis, and an athletic department. The Class of 1962, the first graduating class, consisted of 69 students. Since then, eleven additions have significantly increased the size and facilities of the school.

Demographics
The demographic breakdown of the 878 students enrolled at Divine Child in 2018 was:
Native American/Alaskan - 1.0%; Asian/Pacific islanders - 4.8%; Black - 2.3%; Hispanic - 4.3%; White - 81.4%; Multiracial - 6.2%

Academics
Divine Child offers  20 honors and 19 Advanced Placement courses that can be taken for college credit that include: American Government, American History, Art History, Calculus AB, Chemistry, Computer Science, Computer Science Principles, English Language & Composition, English Literature & Composition, Environmental Science, Spanish, Latin, Music Theory, Physics 1, Physics 2, Statistics, World History, Seminar, and Research. The average ACT score for the school is 28 and has an average SAT score of 1250.

The school also offers an Instructional Support Program (ISP) that provides academic support to students with specific learning differences at tiered levels of intervention, which is unique among private schools.

Bands
The school has four bands which are present: marching band, pep band, symphonic band, and jazz band.

Athletics
The Divine Child Falcons are members of the Catholic High School League, and has the largest athletic program in the league with over fifty teams. Divine Child is ranked among the top five percent of high schools in the United States for athletics. The school colors are red and grey. The following MHSAA sanctioned sports are offered:

Baseball (boys)
State champions - 1992, 2004, 2005, 2008, 2010
Basketball (girls and boys)
Boys state champions - 1973, 1977
Girls state champions - 1986, 1989, 1993, 1994, 2011
Bowling (girls and boys)
Boys State Champions 2021
Competitive cheer (girls)
Cross country (girls and boys)
Football (boys)
State championships - 1975, 1985
Golf (girls and boys)
Ice hockey (boys)
State champions - 2002
Lacrosse (girls and boys)
Soccer (girls and boys)
Softball (girls)
State champions - 1975
Swimming and diving (girls)
Tennis (girls and boys)
Track and field (girls and boys)
Girls state champions - 2010, 2012, 2013
Volleyball (girls)
Wrestling (boys)

Notable Individuals
 Ryan Anderson, MLB pitcher
 Mike Cervenak, MLB player
 Jeff Chadwick, NFL receiver
 Duncan Miller, Senior Guidance, Navigation and Control Engineer at SpaceX.
 Bob LaPointe, American college football head coach.
 Gary Danielson, NFL quarterback
 Tom Dohring, NFL lineman
 James Finn Garner, New York Times bestselling author and satirist. Author of Politically Correct Bedtime Stories.
 Dan Gheesling, American reality television personality, YouTube personality. Big Brother 10 winner, Big Brother 14 runner-up; first contestant to appear in the Final 2 twice.
 Eric Haase, MLB Catcher 
 Jim Herrmann, NFL assistant football coach
 Aidan Hutchinson, Michigan football, NFL player for the Detroit Lions.
 Aria Hutchinson, Miss Michigan USA 2022; Miss USA 2022 contestant. 
 Bryan Kosowski, Emmy Award-winning television director for CBS Sports and Nickelodeon 
 Jordan Oesterle, NHL defenseman
 Lauren Plawecki, Member of the Michigan House of Representatives from the 11th district.
 Chris Rusin, MLB pitcher
 Melissa Sinkevics, 1988 Miss Michigan Teen USA.
 Pat Shurmur, NFL head coach
 Erin E. Stead, Author, illustrator of children's books. Winner of the Caldecott Medal for the most distinguished American picture book for children, A Sick Day for Amos McGee.
 Ron Vanderlinden, Linebackers coach at Air Force Academy; Head football coach at the University of Maryland.
 Marjorie Haskell, Chief Safety & Mission Assurance Officer NASA - Goddard Space Flight Center, Lucy (spacecraft).
 Brian Zahra, Justice of the Michigan Supreme Court
 Bill McCartney, college football coach and founder of Promise Keepers, coached basketball and football at Divine Child early in his career

References

External links

Roman Catholic Archdiocese of Detroit
Educational institutions established in 1958
Buildings with sculpture by Corrado Parducci
Catholic secondary schools in Michigan
Education in Dearborn, Michigan
Schools in Wayne County, Michigan
1958 establishments in Michigan